Joan Linares Rodríguez (born 24 February 1975), commonly known as Joan, is a Spanish futsal player who plays as Pívot en el FS Valdepeñas de segunda división de la LNFS.

Honors
6 División de Honor de Futsal (96/97, 00/01, 02/03, 03/04, 04/05, 07/08)
3 Copa de España de Futsal (03/04, 04/05, 06/07)
4 Intercontinental Futsal Cup (2005, 2006, 2007, 2008)
5 Supercopa de España de Futsal (01/02, 02/03, 03/04, 05/06, 07/08)
5 UEFA Futsal Cup (1998, 2001, 2002, 2004, 2006)
1 Recopa de Europa (2008)
2 Iberian Cup (03/04, 05/06)
1 FIFA Futsal World Cup (2000)
1 UEFA Futsal Championship(Russia 2001)
2 Four Nations Tournament (Netherlands 96, Spain 97)
Champion FIFA Tournament (Singapur 01)
Champion Torneo Centenario Real Madrid (Torrejón 02)
1 MVP of  LNFS (99/00)
1 Best Pívot of LNFS (99/00)
4 Best Left Flank of LNFS (95 to 99)
2 Top scorer División de Honor LNFS (97/98, 99/00)
1 Top scorer División de Plata (08/09)

External links
lnfs.es

1975 births
Living people
Sportspeople from Barcelona
Spanish men's futsal players
FC Barcelona Futsal players
Playas de Castellón FS players
Inter FS players
AD Sala 10 players